David Jack Rose (born December 19, 1957) is an American college basketball coach and the former head coach of Brigham Young University's (BYU) men's basketball team. A graduate of Northbrook High School in Houston, Texas, Rose played two years at Dixie College in St. George, Utah, later becoming coach at the school. Rose then became co-captain of "Phi Slama Jama," the University of Houston's college basketball squad featuring Clyde Drexler and Hakeem Olajuwon that finished as national runner-up in the 1983 NCAA Division I men's basketball tournament.

Career
Dave Rose was named the head basketball coach at BYU in 2005, replacing Steve Cleveland and began the first of eleven straight 20-win seasons in 2005-06. Rose inherited a 9-21 team and immediately posted a 20-9 record, the second best turnaround in college basketball in 2005-06. Rose recruited Jimmer Fredette in 2007, who was selected by all awards as National Player of the Year. In 2010, Rose coached BYU to their first NCAA tournament victory in 17 years in a double-overtime win against the University of Florida. In 2011, Rose's team shared the regular season Mountain West title with San Diego State and advanced to the Sweet Sixteen in the NCAA tournament, BYU's first appearance in that round in 30 years.

In April 2011, Rose signed a five-year head coaching contract extension with BYU. In 2011-12, Rose coached the team in their first season as members of the West Coast Conference. Rose coached the Cougars to their 6th straight NCAA tournament appearance. Participating in the First Four round, the Cougars made the largest comeback in NCAA Tournament history, beating Iona 78-72 after previously trailing by 25. On January 19, 2013, Rose won his 200th game as a Division I coach, in a game against San Diego. He won his 300th game as a Division I coach on February 4, 2017 in a BYU win against Portland. Rose retired from coaching BYU's men's basketball team on March 26, 2019.

Shortly before the start of what would be Rose's last season, the Cougars were stripped of all 47 wins over the 2015-16 and 2016-17 seasons after guard Nick Emery was retroactively declared ineligible for receiving impermissible benefits from boosters. Even with the vacated games, Rose is still the second-winningest coach in school history, behind only Stan Watts.

Personal life
Rose and his wife, Cheryl, are the parents of three children. Rose served a full-time mission for the Church of Jesus Christ of Latter-day Saints in Manchester, England from 1977-79. In June 2009, he was diagnosed with pancreatic cancer and returned to coaching later that year. In October 2019, shortly after his retirement, Rose suffered a severe heart attack. In January 2021, Rose suffered a stroke.

Head coaching record

College

References

1957 births
Living people
American Latter Day Saints
American men's basketball coaches
American men's basketball players
Basketball coaches from Texas
Basketball players from Houston
BYU Cougars men's basketball coaches
College men's basketball head coaches in the United States
Utah Tech Trailblazers men's basketball coaches
Utah Tech Trailblazers men's basketball players
High school basketball coaches in Utah
Houston Cougars men's basketball players
Junior college men's basketball coaches in the United States
Junior college men's basketball players in the United States
Sportspeople from Houston